Lukáš Timulak (born 9 May 1979) is a Slovak dancer and choreographer, working in the Netherlands.

Early life and education 

Lukáš Timulak studied at the Dance Conservatory in Bratislava (Slovakia) and Academie de Danse Classique Princesse Grace in Monaco.

Career 

In 1997 he joined Les Ballets de Monte Carlo where he danced for three years under Jean-Christophe Maillot. From 2000 to 2010, he danced at the Dutch contemporary dance company Nederlands Dans Theater in The Hague, where from 2002 he was one of the leading dancers. At the NDT he worked on new ballet creations by choreographers like Jiří Kylián, Wiliam Forsythe, Mats Ek, Paul Lightfoot & Sol Leon, Hans van Manen, Ohad Naharin, Crystal Pite among others.

From 2001 he started choreographing. Most of his works since 2004 are in collaboration with designer Peter Bilak, who co-authors the concepts of the dance performances. Together they were subject of an exhibition ‘InLoop/EnTry’ in Stroom, Centre for Art and Architecture.

In 2010, he collaborated with Ruben van Leer on ‘Instrument’, a short dance movie which premiered during Cinedans festival in Amstardam. In 2011, he choreographed popular iPhone/iPad app Dance Writer.

Works 

 2011: ‘A Place Between’, Dantzaz Konpainia
 2011: ‘Masculine/Feminine’, Nederlands Dans Theater 2
 2010: ‘Eroica, Gothenburg Ballet 
 2009: ‘Urtanz, TODAYSART
 2008: ‘Real Time’, Slovak National Theater
 2008: ‘Offspring’, Nederlands Dans Theater 2
 2007: ‘Bodily writing’,  C-Scope, Regentes Theater, The Hague
 2007: ‘Oneness’,  Nederlands Dans Theater 2
 2006: ‘I SAW I WAS I’, NDT 1, UpComing Choreographers
 2005: ‘Due a Due’,  C-Scope, Regentes Theater, The Hague
 2005: ‘Twenty’, NDT 1, UpComing Choreographers
 2004: ‘Dear Reader’, C-Scope, Regentes Theater, The Hague

Personal 
Lukáš is married to Italian ballet dancer Valentina Scaglia.

References

External links 
Lukáš Timulak's website
Lukáš Timulak at ndt.nl
Steven Heller, Dancin' Machine

1979 births
Male ballet dancers
Slovak male dancers
Living people
Contemporary dancers